AOSD can refer to:

Adult-onset Still's disease
Aspect-oriented software development
Army Operations Security Detachment, a subordinate unit of the United States Army 902nd Military Intelligence Group